Prince of Tempters is a 1926 American silent romance film directed by Lothar Mendes and starring Lois Moran, Ben Lyon, and Lya De Putti. It is based on the 1924 novel The Ex-Duke by the British writer E. Phillips Oppenheim.

Cast
 Lois Moran as Monica 
 Ben Lyon as Francis 
 Lya De Putti as Dolores 
 Ian Keith as Mario Ambrosio, later Baron Humberto Giordano 
 Mary Brian as Mary 
 Olive Tell as Duchess of Chatsfield 
 Sam Hardy as Apollo Beneventa 
 Henry Vibart as Duke of Chatsfield 
 Judith Vosselli as Signora Wembley 
 Fraser Coalter as Lawyer 
 J. Barney Sherry as Papal Secretary 
 Jeanne Carpenter as Flower girl

Production
The film was made at the Cosmopolitan Studios in New York. It was the first film made in America by the German director Lothar Mendes, who married Dorothy Mackaill while working on the production.

Preservation
A copy of this film is held at the Museum of Modern Art, New York.

References

Bibliography
 Koszarski, Richard. Hollywood on the Hudson: Film and Television in New York from Griffith to Sarnoff. Rutgers University Press, 2008.

External links

1926 films
American romance films
American silent feature films
American black-and-white films
1920s romance films
Films directed by Lothar Mendes
Films set in Italy
Films set in London
Films based on British novels
1920s English-language films
1920s American films